The 2021 NRL season was the 114th of professional rugby league in Australia and the 24th season run by the National Rugby League.

Regular season 
All times are in AEDT (UTC+11:00) up until the 4th of April and AEST (UTC+10:00) from then on.

Round 1 

Cronulla won their first Round 1 game since 2013.
The Roosters winning margin is the biggest win in a Round 1 game since 2002.

Round 2

Penrith became the first NRL side ever to hold teams to 0 points in the first 2 rounds in a season.
Heavy rain and flooding impacted attendances at games held in Sydney and Gosford.

Round 3 

The Brisbane Broncos ended their 13-game losing streak in their win against Canterbury.
The Gold Coast Titans recorded their largest ever score. In the same game, North Queensland suffered their biggest home defeat since Round 14, 2007.
New Zealand recorded their biggest ever comeback after trailing Canberra 31–10 at the 48 minute mark.

Round 4 

Penrith tied the NRL record for the longest away winning streak.
Manly suffered their biggest ever loss at Brookvale Oval, surpassing a 39–0 loss to St George in Round 6, 1963.
Canterbury became just the second side in NRL history (alongside Cronulla in 2014) to fail to score a point in three consecutive matches. They also lost their first four games to start the season for the first time since 1971.
The Cronulla vs North Queensland and Gold Coast vs Canberra games were both moved to Netstrata Jubilee Stadium from the Sunshine Coast Stadium and Cbus Super Stadium respectively, due to COVID concerns in South East Queensland. In addition, the starting times of both games were altered.
Cronulla's 48 Points against the Cowboys was their most of all time against the Cowboys.

Round 5 

A moments silence was held prior to all matches in this round as a tribute to Tommy Raudonikis, who died a day before the first game of the round.
South Sydney's 143 points scored in the first 5 rounds is their most all-time.
Penrith's 5 wins from 5 is the best start to a season in club history.
Penrith became the first team in NRL history to win 20 straight regular season games.
Canterbury recorded their worst start to a season since 1964.
John Morris coached his last game for the Cronulla Sharks after not being offered an extended contract.

Round 6 

Penrith became the first team to win 21 straight regular season games.
Penrith won 11 straight away games, the most in NRL history.
Jack Hetherington of Canterbury was sent off at the 55th minute mark in the Bulldogs game against North Queensland.
The Eels won in Canberra for the first time since 2006.

Round 7 (ANZAC Round) 

The crowd of 12,056 for the Parramatta vs Brisbane match at TIO Stadium is the highest club rugby league match attendance in Darwin's history.
Canterbury became the first team to use the 18th man since it was introduced several weeks earlier, after having two players ruled out with concussion during their game against Cronulla.
The crowd of 37,620 is the highest crowd for an NRL game during the pandemic and the highest since the 2019 NRL Grand Final.
Penrith became the first team to win 22 straight regular season games.

Round 8 

Brisbane recorded their biggest ever comeback after being down 22–0 during the 1st half of their game against the Gold Coast Titans.
Penrith became the 4th ever NRL team since the NRL era (1998) to be undefeated after the first 8 games in the season.

Round 9 

South Sydney recorded their worst loss since Round 16, 2006.

Round 10 (Magic Round)

Round 11 

Brisbane won their first game outside of Queensland since Round 16, 2019, ending a 13-game losing streak.
Penrith became just the 4th side in NSWRL/ARL/NRL history to start a season with 11 wins and no losses. They were also the first side to accomplish this feat since Manly-Warringah in 1995.

Round 12

Round 13 

Due to a COVID-19 lockdown in Victoria, the Melbourne vs Gold Coast match was moved from AAMI Park to the Sunshine Coast Stadium.
 Penrith's loss against the Tigers was their first regular season loss since June 12, 2020.

Round 14 

Penrith's loss to the Sharks marked their first back to back losses since August 23, 2019.

Round 15 

The Melbourne vs Wests Tigers game was moved from AAMI Park to the Sunshine Coast Stadium due to uncertainty regarding the aftermath of the lockdown in Victoria.

Round 16 

Manly's win against Canterbury was their biggest ever.
All games in Sydney and the Central Coast were played in front of empty stadiums due to the COVID-19 lockdown in Greater Sydney, the Central Coast, the Blue Mountains and Wollongong regions. In addition, the Sydney Roosters vs Melbourne Storm game was moved from the Sydney Cricket Ground to McDonald Jones Stadum.

Round 17

Round 18 

From round 18, all nine Sydney-based clubs, plus the Canberra Raiders, Newcastle Knights and New Zealand Warriors were based in Queensland due to the COVID-19 lockdown in Greater Sydney, with the Melbourne Storm also basing themselves on the Sunshine Coast due to a COVID-19 lockdown in Melbourne linked to the Sydney cluster.

Round 19 

Both teams were scoreless for the first half in the Eels vs Raiders game. This was the first occurrence of this in an NRL game in two years, with the previous being the Knights vs Sharks game in Round 1, 2019.
In the Cowboys vs Storm game, Kyle Feldt and Josh Addo-Carr both scored their 100th tries in their NRL careers for their respective teams, occurring in the 51st and 71st minutes, respectively.

Round 20 

BB Print Stadium in Mackay hosted their third ever NRL game, and their first in 8 years, since their last in 2013.
Browne Park in Rockhampton and Moreton Daily Stadium in Redcliffe were originally scheduled to host their first ever NRL games for premiership points. However, following a lockdown announced on 31 July in South East Queensland due to a COVID-19 outbreak, these games, along with the Bulldogs vs Titans game, were moved to Suncorp Stadium. They were played in front of an empty stadium, with 31 July games moved to 1 August, and 1 August games moved to 2 August.

Round 21 

All games were played in front of empty stadiums due to the COVID-19 outbreak and lockdown in South East Queensland. In addition, the Knights vs Broncos and the Bulldogs vs Tigers games were moved from Sunshine Coast Stadium and Moreton Daily Stadium to Suncorp Stadium and Cbus Super Stadium, respectively.
In the Eels vs Rabbitohs game, Adam Reynolds surpassed the Rabbitohs' individual player points record of all time, previously held by Eric Simms at 1841 points.

Round 22 

Moreton Daily Stadium hosted their first ever NRL games for premiership points. It was previously scheduled to host a match in Round 20, however this was cancelled due to the COVID-19 outbreak and lockdown in South East Queensland earlier in the month.
In the Storm vs Raiders game, the Storm reached a new club record for the highest number of points in a single season.
South Sydney won 10 matches in a row for the first time since 1989.
In the Sea Eagles vs Eels game, Reuben Garrick surpassed the Sea Eagles' individual player points record for a single season, previously held by Matthew Ridge at 257 points.

Round 23 

Browne Park hosted their first ever NRL game for premiership points. It was previously scheduled to host a match in Round 20, however this was cancelled due to the COVID-19 outbreak and lockdown in South East Queensland earlier in the month.
The Storm tied the record for the most consecutive match wins in a single season, equalling the Eastern Suburbs Roosters record of 19 in 1975.

Round 24

Round 25 

In the Cowboys vs Sea Eagles game, Reuben Garrick surpassed the NRL record for the highest number of points in a regular season at 304 points, previously held by Hazem El Masri at 288 points.
Matt Cecchin controlled his last NRL game as a referee, after announcing his second NRL retirement earlier in the week.
The Gold Coast Titans recorded their biggest ever win and the biggest win by any Gold Coast side since Round 16, 1996.

Finals series

Queensland Country Bank Stadium, Sunshine Coast Stadium, Browne Park and BB Print Stadium all hosted their first ever NRL finals matches.
Both preliminary finals had altered starting times. The South Sydney vs Manly final was delayed by 15 minutes after Manly were caught in heavy traffic en route to the game, while the Melbourne vs Penrith final was moved from 7:50pm to 4:00pm to avoid a clash with the 2021 AFL Grand Final.

References 

2021 NRL season